The Killam Prize (previously the Izaak Walton Killam Memorial Prize) was established according to the will of Dorothy J. Killam to honour the memory of her husband Izaak Walton Killam.

Five Killam Prizes, each having a value of $100,000, were awarded annually by the Canada Council for the Arts to eminent Canadian researchers who distinguish themselves in the fields of social sciences, humanities, natural sciences, health sciences, or engineering.

In August 2021, the Canada Council announced it would transition the administration of the Killam program to the National Research Council Canada (NRC) by March 2022. 

The restructured Killam Program was officially launched under the administration of the NRC in April 2022. It is now called the National Killam Program and consists of the Killam Prizes and the Dorothy Killam Fellowships.

Recipients

See also

 List of medicine awards
 List of social sciences awards

References

External links
 Killam Laureates website
 Canada Council for the Arts Killam Prizes webpage
 Transition to the National Research Council of Canada from the Canada Council for the Arts

Canadian science and technology awards

fr:Prix Izaak-Walton-Killam